Cellular Agriculture Society (or CAS) is a lobby organization. It is an international 501(c)(3) organization based in Miami, created in 2017 to research, fund and advance cellular agriculture.

Cellular Agriculture is the emerging science of producing animal products from cells instead of from live animals.

Cellular Agriculture, or Cell-Ag, is actively developing foodstuffs and other animal products that include meat, milk, and eggs, also leather, silk and even rhinoceros horn from animal cells.

Cellular agriculture uses biotechnology to produce animal products currently harvested from living tissue. Expectations are the science will evolve to create non harvested meat and animal products that will meet the demand for Animal products without harming the animals themselves.

Cellular agriculture sciences are evolving based on two techniques:

 Tissue Engineering (growing tissues in a laboratory)
 Fermentation (using microorganisms derive proteins).

The process is controversial as certain government ( France, Australia and most recently the state of Missouri) entities are in conflict over what can officially be termed "meat".

Terminologies have emerged to describe the products though final terminology for the products are not widely accepted yet.

 In-vitro meat
lab-grown meat
cellular agriculture
 clean meat
cultured meat

References 

Biotechnology
Cellular agriculture
Emerging technologies
Meat
Sustainable food system
Synthetic biology